Miss Universo Argentina 2016, the Miss Universo Argentina pageant, was held on November 6, 2016. Claudia Barrionuevo crowned Estefanía Bernal at end of the event. Bernal represented Argentina at Miss Universe 2016 pageant. The pageant was hosted by Horacio Cabak, and featured guest performances from Miranda! and Mike Amigorena.

Final results

Delegates 
The 16 official delegates were selected on several castings.

Judges
 Magazine Caras Manageress, Liliana Castaño.
 Blogger, Constanza Crotto.
 Blogger, Mariana Gándara.
 Argentine Designer, Benito Fernández.
 Former soccer player, former model and current Argentinean television actor and conductor, Sergio Goycochea.
 Argentina Model, Luli Fernández.

Miss Universo Uruguay 2016 
Because Endemol Argentina and TNT Latinoamerica obtained the Miss Universe franchise for Uruguay and Argentina, they decided to carry out the election of the Uruguayan representative to Miss Universe during a special segment of Miss Universo Argentina.

Final results

Delegates 
The 6 official delegates were selected on several castings.

See also
 Miss Universe Argentina 2011

References

External links
 Miss Universo Argentina Official website

2016
2016 in Argentina
2016 beauty pageants